M(a)cLaughlin  is the most common Anglicized form of Mac Lochlainn, a masculine surname of Irish origin. The feminine form of the surname is Nic Lochlainn. The literal meaning of the name is "son of Lochlann". Note that Mc is simply a contraction of Mac, which is also (albeit rarely) truncated to M' .  Thus, MacLaughlin, McLaughlin and M'Laughlin are the same Anglicism, the latter two merely contractions of the first.

The original surname Mac/Nic Lochlainn was borne by a family of Cenél nEógain, a branch of the historic northern O'Neill dynasty, reputedly founded by Niall Noígíallach. This family expanded across the North Channel into Scotland, where it became the Clan MacLachlan.

M(a)cLaughlin is sometimes used as a modern form of O'Melaghlin/Melaghlin, which is more commonly modernised McLoughlin, M'Loughlin, and O'Loughlin (among other spellings). O'Melaghlin was a phonetic rendering into Anglo-Norman and Middle English of ó Mǽilsheáchlainn. That family is part of the historic Clann Cholmáin, a branch of the Southern Uí Néill, cousins to the Northern Uí Néill. Ó/Ní M(h)ǽilsheáchlainn was the surname chosen by the descendants of Máel Sechnaill II, King of Meath, 976–1022, and High King of Ireland, 979–1002 & 1014–1022.

M(a)cLaughlin and M(a)cLoughlin are rarely English forms of the surname ó/ní Lachtna, a phonetic corruption of the much more common Loughney or M(a)cLoughney.

Unlike Irish surnames that have only one Gaelic source for their English form, it is not possible to tell by the spelling McLaughlin and other English spellings whether the person bearing the name is descended from the Mac/Nic Lochlainn family, the Ó/Ní M(h)ǽilsheáchlainn family, or the Ó/Ní Lachtna family.

People
 Alan C. McLaughlin, Scottish cinematographer.
 Alana McLaughlin, American, US Army special forces, Mixed Martial Arts athlete, Transgender woman
 Alden McLaughlin, Premier,  second elected member for the district George Town, Grand Cayman, Cayman Islands
 Alford L. McLaughlin, American, USMC, (1928–1977), Medal of Honor recipient
 Andrew C. McLaughlin, American historian of Scottish immigrant parents
 Ann McLaughlin Korologos, (formerly known as Ann Dore McLaughlin) was United States Secretary of Labor from 1987 to 1989
 Anneisha McLaughlin, a Jamaican sprinter who specializes in the 200 metres
 Anthony McLaughlin, Canadian, a farmer and political figure in Prince Edward Island
 Audrey McLaughlin, former leader of Canada's New Democratic Party
 Barry McLaughlin, a Scottish former professional footballer
 Benny McLaughlin, a former U.S. soccer forward who starred in the American Soccer League
 Bernard "Bernie" McLaughlin, Irish-American gangster from Charlestown, Massachusetts and leader of "The McLaughlin Brothers" gang
 Bernard Joseph McLaughlin, American Bishop of the Roman Catholic Church
 Betsy McLaughlin, American, the current CEO of Hot Topic, Inc. and founder of Torrid
 Bill McLaughlin, Australian Rugby Union player and President of the Australian Rugby Union
 Billy McLaughlin, new age acoustic guitarist, composer and producer from Minnesota, United States
 Bo McLaughlin, American, a Major League Baseball pitcher
 Brian McLaughlin (footballer born 1954), Scottish footballer, whose clubs include Celtic and Motherwell
 Brian McLaughlin (footballer born 1974), Scottish footballer, whose clubs include Celtic and Wigan Athletic
 Brian McLaughlin (politician), former American Democratic politician from Flushing, Queens
 Bruce McLaughlin, Canadian politician who served as a Member of the Northwest Territories Legislature
 Byron McLaughlin, American, a former professional baseball player
 Caleb McLaughlin, American, an actor, mainly known for playing Lucas Sinclair in Stranger Things
 Charles Borromeo McLaughlin, American, the first bishop of the Roman Catholic Diocese of Saint Petersburg
 Charles F. McLaughlin, American, Nebraska Democratic politician
 Chase McLaughlin (born 1996), American football player
 Chester B. McLaughlin (1856–1929), New York lawyer and politician
 Chris McLaughlin, British journalist, who since 2004 has been editor of the Labour Party-supporting weekly UK magazine Tribune
 Christian McLaughlin, American, a television writer, producer, and author
 Claire McLaughlin, Northern Ireland rugby union player
 Corinne McLaughlin, Scottish, author and a leader in the intentional communities movement
 Dan McLaughlin, American, a professional sports broadcaster who currently works on both St. Louis Cardinals and St. Louis Blues telecasts
 David McLaughlin (disambiguation), several people
 Dean Benjamin McLaughlin, American astronomer
 Dean McLaughlin (writer), American science fiction writer, and son of Dean B. McLaughlin
 Denis McLaughlin, Irish footballer currently playing for RS Gimnástica de Torrelavega as a striker
 Dennis McLaughlin, American engineer 
 Donal McLaughlin, American architect and designer of the Flag of the United Nations
 Dylan McLaughlin, American film and television actor
 Earle McLaughlin, a Canadian banker
 Edward F. McLaughlin, Jr., American politician who served as Lieutenant Governor for the Commonwealth of Massachusetts
 Edward McLaughlin, American, a former boxer and a member of the "McLaughlin Brothers" gang of Charlestown, Massachusetts
 Ellen McLaughlin, American playwright and actor for stage and film
 Emily McLaughlin, American soap opera actress
 Emma McLaughlin, American novelist
 Frank McLaughlin (disambiguation), several people
 Frederic McLaughlin, American, the first owner of the Chicago Black Hawks
 Gayle McLaughlin, American, the Green Party mayor of the city of Richmond, California and a member of Richmond's City Council
 George Vincent McLaughlin, President of the Brooklyn Trust Company; New York City Police Commissioner; State Superintendent of Banks; and Vice Chairman of the Triborough Bridge and Tunnel Authority
 Gibb McLaughlin, English film actor
 Grace McLaughlin, U.S artistic gymnast
 Hugh McLaughlin (footballer), Australian rules footballer who played with South Melbourne and Footscray in the VFL during the 1930s
 Hugh McLaughlin (politician) (1827–1904), American politician and political boss
 Hugh McLaughlin (publisher) (1918–2006), Irish publisher and inventor
 Jake McLaughlin, American military and actor
 James Henry McLaughlin (Seabee USN) (1933-2008) help steal a train from the Koreans 
 James McLaughlin (Indian agent) (1842–1923), U.S. Indian Service Agent & Inspector, ordered the 1890 arrest of Sitting Bull
 James C. McLaughlin (1858–1932), U.S. Representative from Michigan
 Janice McLaughlin (1942–2021), American nun, missionary, and human rights activist
 James "Kid" McLaughlin (1888–1914), 20th-century baseball player (1914 Cincinnati Reds)
 James Wellington McLaughlin, Canadian, Ontario doctor and political figure
 Jason McLaughlin (American soccer), American soccer player, currently plays both midfielder and forward for the Atlanta Silverbacks of the USL First Division
 Jason McLaughlin, the American student gunman in the Rocori High School shooting
 Jim McLaughlin (coach), American volleyball coach
 Jim McLaughlin (footballer), a former Northern Irish footballer
 Jim McLaughlin (jockey), an American thoroughbred race horse jockey
 Joe McLaughlin (footballer), Scottish, a retired professional footballer who played for Chelsea
 Joe McLaughlin (sportswriter), American, one of Texas' most well-known and respected professional sportswriters
 Joey McLaughlin, American, a right-handed relief pitcher who played for the Atlanta Braves, Toronto Blue Jays, and Texas Rangers
 John McLaughlin (disambiguation), several people
 Jon McLaughlin, American pop/rock singer-songwriter
 Joseph McLaughlin (disambiguation), several people
 Jud McLaughlin, American, a relief pitcher in Major League Baseball who played for the Boston Red Sox
 Keauna McLaughlin, American pair skater
 Kevin McLaughlin (rugby player), a professional rugby union player from Ireland
 Kiaran McLaughlin, American Thoroughbred racehorse trainer
 Leon McLaughlin, American, offensive lineman who played five seasons in the NFL
 Louisa McLaughlin (1836–1921) British Red Cross nurse in the Franco-Prussian War: Joseph Lister used her nursing home
 Marc McLaughlin (born 1999), American ice hockey player
 Marie McLaughlin, a Scottish operatic soprano
 Mark McLaughlin, Scottish footballer currently playing for Scottish Premier League club Hamilton Academical
 Martin McLaughlin, professor of Italian and Fiat-Serena Professor of Italian Studies at the University of Oxford
 Mary A. McLaughlin, (born 1946), American federal judge
 Mary A. McLaughlin, known more commonly as Mary A. Clem, American mathematician, and a human computer.
Mary Ann McLaughlin, American cardiologist
 Mary C. McLaughlin (died 2014), American public health official
 Mary Louise McLaughlin, American ceramic painter and studio potter from Cincinnati, Ohio
 Marya McLaughlin (1928–1998), American television journalist
 Mel McLaughlin, Australian television presenter
 Melvin O. McLaughlin, American, a Nebraska republican politician
Michael McLaughlin (disambiguation), several people, including Mike McLaughlin
 Michelle McLaughlin, American, was Playboy's Playmate of the Month for February 2008
 Mignon McLaughlin, American journalist, Glamour Magazine editor and author born in 1913
 Mitchel McLaughlin, Northern Ireland, the former General Secretary of Sinn Féin and an MLA
 Moses A. McLaughlin, Irish born, Union Army officer, farmer, later a doctor; known for his role in the Keyesville Massacre, and victorious campaign in the Owens Valley Indian War
 Pádraig Mac Lochlainn, Irish member of parliament (TD) for Donegal North East, Sinn Féin spokesperson on Foreign Affairs and Trade
 Pat McLaughlin, American, a successful singer/songwriter in Nashville, TN
 Patricia McLaughlin, a unionist politician in Northern Ireland and one of the earliest female Members of Parliament from the region
 Patrick McLaughlin (disambiguation), several people
 Paul McLaughlin (disambiguation), several people
 Peter McLaughlin (Minnesota politician), American politician
 Rhett McLaughlin, American internet personality, part of the comedy duo Rhett and Link
 Robert E. McLaughlin, TIME Magazine editor, author and playwright, born in 1908
 Robert McLaughlin (industrialist), Canadian, a manufacturer who founded the McLaughlin Carriage and McLaughlin Motor Car companies which later became part of General Motors
 Ryan McLaughlin, Northern Irish footballer currently playing for Rochdale
 Samuel McLaughlin, a Canadian businessman
 Sara Agnes Mclaughlin Conboy (born Sara Agnes Mclaughlin), a labor organizer in the United States
 Scott McLaughlin (racing driver), New Zealand professional racing driver currently competing in the IndyCar Series
 Scott McLaughlin (bishop), American bishop of the Orthodox Anglican Church
 Scott McLaughlin (footballer), Scottish footballer currently playing for Airdrie United
 Sean McLaughlin (disambiguation), several people
 Seán William McLoughlin, Irish YouTuber
 Steve McLaughlin (disambiguation), several people
 Sydney McLaughlin, American athlete specialized in the 400m hurdles and world record holder.
 Theresa Marie Korn née McLaughlin (1926–2020), American engineer, daughter-in-law of Arthur Korn
 Warren McLaughlin, American left-handed pitcher with the Philadelphia Phillies and Pittsburgh Pirates from 1900 to 1903
 William F. McLaughlin (Michigan), American politician from the State of Michigan

See also
 Lochlann
 McLaughlin group (mathematics), a sporadic finite simple group
 The McLaughlin Group, a weekly public affairs program broadcast in the United States

References

Anglicised Scottish Gaelic-language surnames
Anglicised Irish-language surnames
Surnames of Ulster-Scottish origin
Patronymic surnames